Schlei is a surname, and people with the surname are as follows:

 Admiral Schlei (1878–1958), American baseball player
 Blake Lindsley, born Norma Blake Lindsley Schlei,  American actress
 Marie Schlei (1919–1983), German politician

See also
 Schlei (disambiguation)

German-language surnames